Ala-arriba is an expression that means "(upwards) strength" used by the population of the Portuguese city of Póvoa de Varzim. It represents the co-operation between the inhabitants and is also the motto of Póvoa de Varzim. This expression was used when the population dragged a boat to the beach, before the harbour was built.

After the harbour of Póvoa de Varzim this practise died out. Despite that the expression continued being used to name companies, and by some politicians.

March
There is also an Ala-arriba march. Lyrics by Albano Ribeiro, and music by Eduardo Correia.

note: each verse repeats twice.

See also
Mutual aid
 Bayanihan (Filipino)
 Dugnad (Norwegian)
 Gadugi (Cherokee)
 Gotong royong (Indonesia and Malaysia)
 Meitheal (Irish)
 Naffir (Sudanese Arabic)
 Talkoot (Finnish)

External links
Ala-arriba march in PDF
Ala-Arriba in MP3

Culture in Póvoa de Varzim